The AN/ARC-190 is an airborne HF communications system, found on C-130, C-20, KC-135, C-141, C-5, C-9, KC-10, B-1, B-52, C-17, E-3, E-4, E-8 JSTARS, F-15, F-16, H-53, H-60, S-2T, and Bell Boeing V-22 Osprey aircraft.

System Description
The ARC-190 is a military HF radio that operates between 2-30 MHz and transmits at 300+ watts. It features a dual heterodyne receiver/transmitter that uses IF frequencies of 97.8 and 1.8 MHz, an antenna coupler that is pressurized to 7±1 PSI with dry nitrogen (air) which (1) prevents high voltage arcing, (2) prevents corrosion, (3) provides a uniform cooling medium, and one of various controls which provide access to 30 preset channels, 30,000 normal channels, 280,000 channels when using SSB, test functions, squelch, power on/off, and one of 8 modes of operation: UV (Upper Voice), LV (Lower Voice), UD (Upper Data), LD (Lower Data), CW (Continuous Wave), AME (Amplitude Modulated Equivalent), P (Preset) and A (not used).

ACS mod
In the late 90s, ARC-190 systems on various airframes underwent a modification to the Auto Communications System which included a new control panel and the ACS processor. The system was designed for long distance communications using ACS capable ground stations which would traffic calls via HF radio and commercial phone lines.

See also
 List of military electronics of the United States

External links
 Description from manufacturer's catalog
 GlobalSecurity.org article

Equipment of the United States Air Force
Military radio systems of the United States
Military electronics of the United States